Inodrillia avira is a species of sea snail, a marine gastropod mollusk in the family Horaiclavidae.

It was previously included within the family Turridae.

Description
The length of the shell attains 10.1 mm.

Distribution
This marine species occurs off East Florida, at depths between 183 and 382 m

References
Notes

Sources
 Bartsch P., A Review of Some West Atlantic Turritid Mollusks. Memorias de la Sociedad Cubana de Historia Natural, 17 (2):81-122, plates 7-15

External links
  Tucker, J.K. 2004 Catalog of recent and fossil turrids (Mollusca: Gastropoda). Zootaxa 682:1–1295.

avira